Most Affected People and Areas, also known by its acronym MAPA, is a term that represents groups and territories disproportionately affected by climate change, such as women, indigenous communities, racial minorities, LGBTQ+ people, young, older and poorer people and the global south. The term and concept is interconnected with intersectionality. These communities bear the brunt of carbon emissions and climate change. In particular, with the rise of grassroots movements that had the goal of climate justice - such as Fridays for Future, Ende Gelände or Extinction Rebellion - the connection of these groups in the context of climate justice became more important. The term is usually preferred by climate change activists to older concepts such as global south.

References 

Climate justice